KXLM (102.9 FM) is a radio station broadcasting Regional Mexican format. It is licensed to Oxnard, California, United States, and serves Ventura County California.  The station is owned by Radio Lazer.

External links

XLM
XLM